Alloy 20 is an austenitic stainless steel containing less than 50% iron developed for applications involving sulfuric acid. Its corrosion resistance also finds other uses in the chemical, petrochemical, power generation, and plastics industries. Alloy 20 resists pitting and chloride ion corrosion, better than 304 stainless steel and on par with 316L stainless steel. Its copper content protects it from sulfuric acid. Alloy 20 is often chosen to solve stress corrosion cracking problems, which may occur with 316L stainless. Alloy of the same name with the designation "Cb-3" indicates columbium stabilized.

Composition 
 Nickel, 32–38%
 Chromium, 19–21%
 Carbon, 0.06% maximum
 Copper, 3–4%
 Molybdenum, 2–3%
 Manganese, 2% maximum
 Silicon, 1.0% maximum
 Niobium, (8.0 X C), 1% maximum
 Iron, 31–44% (balance)

Other names 
 UNS N08020
 DIN 2.4660
 CN7M
 Carpenter 20 CB-3
 AL 20
 Carlson Alloy C20
 Nickelvac 23
 Nicrofer 3620 Nb, also known as VDM Alloy 20

Specifications 
 ASTM B729, B464, B366, B463, B473, B462
 ASME SB729, SB464, SB366, SB473, SB462
 ANSI / ASTM A555-79
 EN 2.4660
 UNS N08020
 Werkstoff 2.4660
 Castings are designated CN7M

References 

Steels
Chromium alloys
Nickel alloys